The name Alberto has been used for seven tropical cyclones in the Atlantic Ocean:

Hurricane Alberto (1982) – a Category 1 hurricane that formed near Cuba, where it caused 23 deaths from heavy flooding.
Tropical Storm Alberto (1988) – moved offshore up the east coast of the United States and crossed the Canadian Maritimes; caused no major damage.
Tropical Storm Alberto (1994) – made landfall in Florida, continued over Georgia and Alabama, causing significant damage from flooding; caused 30 deaths and $1.03 billion (1994 USD) damages, mostly in Georgia.
Hurricane Alberto (2000) – a long-lasting Category 3 hurricane in the Atlantic which did not approach land.
Tropical Storm Alberto (2006) – made landfall about 50 miles southeast of Tallahassee, Florida, before causing minor damage and flooding in the Carolinas.
Tropical Storm Alberto (2012) – an early season tropical storm which did not affect land.
Tropical Storm Alberto (2018) – a damaging pre-season storm that made landfall in Florida causing 12 fatalities and heavy flooding. 

Atlantic hurricane set index articles